Edward Walter Scott  (April 30, 1916 – June 21, 2004) was a Canadian Anglican bishop.

Scott was born in Edmonton, Alberta in 1916 and grew up in Vancouver, British Columbia, where his father was a rector. He attended Anglican Theological College and was ordained in 1941. He became Bishop of Kootenay in 1966.

Scott served as primate of the Anglican Church of Canada from 1971 to 1986 and was also moderator of the Central Committee of the World Council of Churches from 1975 to 1983. He was considered a liberal in the church and was an advocate of reforms such as the ordination of women. In the late 1980s Scott served on the Commonwealth of Nations "Eminent Persons Group" that recommended the implementation of sanctions against South Africa.

Scott was awarded the Pearson Peace Medal in 1988 and was made a Companion of the Order of Canada in 1978.

Scott died in a car accident near Parry Sound, Ontario in 2004.

Sources
Radical Compassion: The Life and Times of Archbishop Edward Scott by Hugh McCullum

External links
 Pearson Medal of Peace - Archbishop Edward Scott

1916 births
2004 deaths
20th-century Anglican Church of Canada bishops
Accidental deaths in Ontario
Anglican bishops of Kootenay
Companions of the Order of Canada
People from Edmonton
People from Vancouver
Primates of the Anglican Church of Canada
Road incident deaths in Canada